Elton Everett Sawyer (born November 5, 1959) is a former NASCAR driver. He is married to former NASCAR driver Patty Moise. Sawyer is currently the senior Vice President of competition of NASCAR, having previously been the Vice President of Officiating and Technical Inspection.

Career Start
Sawyer began his career in the NASCAR Busch Series. He ran a handful of races in 1983, 1984, and 1985, scoring 8 top tens while running his own team.  From 1986 to 1989, he ran full-time seasons with Lewis Motorsports.  Sawyer ran competitively, scoring many top tens, while finishing between 14th and 18th in points in all of those years.  Sawyer left the Lewis organization, after not winning in his four seasons with the team, and headed to the team owned by A.G. Dillard.  In 1990, Sawyer ran his best career season, scoring 4 top fives and finishing 13th in the points.  However the following year, the Dillard team faced sponsorship problems, which kept Sawyer from completing the whole year. He salvaged a 20th-place finish in the points that year.  The sponsorship issues that affected Sawyer in 1991 also caused problems for him the next two years.  He was not able to find a solid ride, and only competed in 4 races.

Mid 1990s
However, luck changed for Sawyer in 1994 when he found a solid ride at Sutton Racing.  He would go on to win his first Busch Series race at Myrtle Beach Speedway.  He would only have six more top tens the remaining of the year, finishing 14th in points.  In 1995, Sawyer continued driving in the Busch Series full-time for Sutton, but he was named to replace Loy Allen Jr. in the No. 27 Winston Cup car Junior Johnson & Associates. Sawyer's Cup season did not fare too well, but his Busch year was his best of date, finishing 9th in points. In that same year, Sawyer competed in the Winston Select, driving the No. 27 car of Junior Johnson that made it in, thanks to Jimmy Spencer winning twice the previous year.

Sawyer started the 1996 Cup season driving for David Blair Motorsports. However, after sponsorship problems, he was released from the team. He then decided to jump back down to Busch, however he did not grab a solid ride until 1997, when he rejoined Sutton.  Sawyer would go on to finish 8th in points.  In 1998, he had a great year, finishing 5th in points, after scoring 10 top tens.  In 1999, Sawyer joined Akins Motorsports in the Busch Series.  Sawyer had one of his most competitive years, winning a race at New Hampshire International Speedway.  He also scored 14 top tens, and finished 5th in points.  2000 was also a great year for Sawyer after he scored once again 14 top tens and finished 6th in points.

2001-Present
2001 turned out to be Sawyer's last full season in NASCAR. He raced competitively, scoring his career high of 19 top-tens in a season, while finishing 5th in points. Akins had sold the No. 98 car to Michael Kranefuss in April 2001, however the team was unable to secure sponsorship after the season and folded, causing Sawyer to search for a ride for 2002. Sawyer did race 3 races in 2002 for the ailing Jeff Purvis at Brewco Motorsports. However, David Green received the ride in 2003.  Sawyer continued looking for a ride; however, he was unable to find one due to the trend of teams wanting young drivers with sponsorship money.

On February 2, 2015, NASCAR announced that Sawyer would become the managing director of the Camping World Truck Series, replacing Chad Little, who was moved to a new role within the organization. Sawyer had previously served as the director of team operations for Action Express Racing in the TUDOR United SportsCar Championship.

Sawyer along with John Probst help design the "Next Gen" car in 2021

Motorsports career results

NASCAR
(key) (Bold – Pole position awarded by qualifying time. Italics – Pole position earned by points standings or practice time. * – Most laps led.)

Winston Cup Series

Daytona 500

Busch Series

References

External links
 

Living people
1959 births
Sportspeople from Chesapeake, Virginia
Racing drivers from Virginia
NASCAR drivers
NASCAR team owners